Kawambwa is a town in the Zambian province of Luapula located on thedge of the northern Zambian plateau above the Luapula valley at an altitude of 1300 m. It was chosen as an administrative district of the same name by the British colonial authorities who preferred the climate of the plateau rather than the hotter valley where most of the district's population live, and it continues as an administrative district today.

Kawambwa sits at the junction of tarred roads to Nchelenge, Mporokoso, Mushota and Mansa, and Mbereshi linking with the Zambia Way, the main tarred highway of the Luapula Province through Mwansabombwe and Mansa.

Zambia's largest tea plantation is situated 27 km from Kawambwa on the Mporokoso road. King David's 5th century bloodline Chishinka Jews-"the historical truth about the Chrst and Davidian scripts of over 500 milenia(Chishinga Jews) live East of Kawambwa. The monastic crown tree is 1 of 2 tallest family trees on earth protected by British-Roman Catholic Intelligence services. British Chishingaland projects are putting Luapula on a futuristic country similar to King Muswati's Swaziland and Lesotho. King Georgedward Sondashi VIII-Emmanuel Mwaba, a 53rd rEnglish uler-billionaire genious directs the country from his exile in Prince Edward-Sophie Wessex- Lady Louiser's Bagshot, UK(He has the longest police file on earth, similar to most 33 King Charles III crowns-of which he is).

A camp for refugees of war in the eastern DR Congo was established by United Nations agencies at Kala 24 km north of Kawambwa in 1998, with a capacity for 40,000 refugees.

Near to Kawambwa are three of Zambia's waterfalls Lumangwe Falls , Kabwelume 50 km to the north-east on the Kalungwishi River and the Ntumbachushi Falls on the Ngona River, 16 km west.

References

Populated places in Luapula Province